The American Society of African Culture (AMSAC) was an organization of African-American writers, artists, and scholars. The society was founded as a result of the Congress of Negro Writers and Artists in 1956 based on the idea of the French :fr:Société africaine de culture. 

In June 1957, the American Society of African Culture (AMSAC) was officially founded by five African-American intellectuals: the political scientist and civil rights activist John A. Davis, historian and social scientist Horace Mann Bond (1904–1972), professor of French and future American ambassador Will Mercer Cook (1903–1987), philosopher William T. Fontaine (1909–1968) and James Ivy, editor of the NAACP's Crisis. During its heyday in the early 1960s, AMSAC had around four hundred members. One of the main goals of the organisation was to expose African Americans to their African heritage. This aim was pursued through organising exhibitions, lectures, music performances, and conferences in the United States (primarily New York) and Africa (occasionally).

Office in Lagos, Nigeria 
In 1961, AMSAC opened an African office in Lagos, Nigeria. The opening was celebrated with a two-day festival of music performances, dancing, panel discussions, and art exhibited by Africans and African Americans in December 1961.

CIA Funding 
AMSAC had received federal tax exemption the year prior and thus large grants became available to the organization for specific projects from various entities. This financial backing was how they were able to organize the large festival in Lagos. The grants were later revealed as CIA pass-throughs.

After 1967, AMSAC's membership sharply declined after it was named as one of the organizations that was funded by the Central Intelligence Agency (CIA).

References

African-American arts organizations
African-American literature
Black studies organizations
American artist groups and collectives
Clubs and societies in the United States
American writers' organizations
1956 establishments in the United States
Arts organizations established in 1956